Yung may refer to:
 Yung (surname), Chinese surname
 Yung Joc, (born Jasiel Robinson in 1983), an American rapper
 Yung Wun, (born James Carlton Anderson in 1982), an American rapper
 Yung Berg, (born Christian Ward in 1985), an American rapper
 Yung L.A., (born Leland Austin), an American rapper
 Yung, (born 1988), band member of Cali Swag District
 Yung Lean (born Jonatan Leandoer Håstad), a Swedish rapper
 Yung Gravy, (born Matthew Raymond Hauri in 1996), an American rapper

See also
 Yong (disambiguation)
 Young (disambiguation)
 Jung (disambiguation)